Elyria station is an Amtrak station in Elyria, Ohio.  Located at 410 East River Road, the building is a small bus stop-type shelter.

Elyria is served by the Capitol Limited and Lake Shore Limited routes, both of which pass through Elyria in the middle of the night. Starting in 1998 the Chicago-Philadelphia Pennsylvanian stopped in Elyria until 2003 when the train reverted the original Pittsburgh-New York route.

The former New York Central Station is in downtown Elyria. It was built in 1925 as a replacement for a former Lake Shore and Michigan Southern Railway depot, and has been purchased by the Lorain County government for use as a transportation center. The building had been used for many years as a beauty school since it was sold by Conrail. The county hopes to use the building again for Amtrak trains. On August 1, 2013 it was announced that Amtrak has offered to pay 2.9 million dollars towards the project in hopes of relocating its passenger service there.

On October 25, 2013, the station building caught fire, causing an estimated $25,000 in damage and closing the station building indefinitely, with passenger access limited to the platform.

References

External links

 Elyria Landmarks
 Elyria Amtrak Station (USA Rail Guide -- Train Web)

Amtrak stations in Ohio
Chicago Line (Norfolk Southern)
Buildings and structures in Lorain County, Ohio
Elyria, Ohio
Transportation in Lorain County, Ohio
Railway stations in the United States opened in 1975